Jack Della Maddalena (born September 10, 1996) is an Australian mixed martial artist who competes in the Welterweight division of the Ultimate Fighting Championship. As of February 14, 2023, he is #14 in the UFC welterweight rankings.

Background

Della Maddalena started playing rugby at the age of 8, playing it from year 6 to year 12. Due to the influence of his older brother Josh, Maddalena joined a boxing gym at the age of 14, using it to improve his fitness for the rugby season. He fell in love with the sport, and after his rugby career ended, he transitioned into full-time MMA training.

Della Maddalena attended St. Kevin's College in Melbourne, Victoria and Aquinas College in Perth, Western Australia.

Mixed martial arts career

Early career

He made his professional debut on March 12, 2016 against Aldin Bates, losing the contest via TKO in the 3rd round. He went on to lose his next fight against Darcy Vendy via submission in the first round, before accumulating a nine-fight winning streak whilst securing the Eternal Welterweight Championship and defending it four times.

Della Maddalena was invited to face Ange Loosa on September 14, 2021 at Dana White's Contender Series 39, where he won the bout via unanimous decision and secured a UFC contract.

Ultimate Fighting Championship
Della Maddalena was scheduled to make his UFC debut against The Ultimate Fighter: Brazil 3 middleweight winner Warlley Alves on January 22, 2022 at UFC 270. However, Alves pulled out in early January due to undisclosed reasons and he was replaced by promotional newcomer Pete Rodriguez. He won the bout via TKO in the first round.

Della Maddalena faced Ramazan Emeev on June 11, 2022, at UFC 275. He won the fight via TKO in round one. This win earned him the Performance of the Night award.

Della Maddalena faced Danny Roberts on November 19, 2022, at UFC Fight Night: Nzechukwu vs. Cuțelaba. He won the fight via technical knockout in round one. With this win, Della Maddalena earned his second straight Performance of the Night bonus.

Della Maddalena faced Randy Brown on February 12, 2023 at UFC 284. He won the bout via first round submission. The win earned him the Performance of the Night award.

Championships and accomplishments

Mixed martial arts
Ultimate Fighting Championship
Performance of the Night (Three Times)  
Eternal MMA
 EMMA Welterweight Championship (One time)
Four successful title defenses
Reign Fighting
RF Welterweight Championship (One time)
ESPN
2022 UFC Men's Rookie of the Year
Cageside Press
2022 Newcomer of the Year

Mixed martial arts record

|-
|Win
|align=center|14–2
|Randy Brown
|Submission (rear-naked choke)
|UFC 284
| 
|align=center|1
|align=center|2:13
|Perth, Australia 
|
|-
|Win
|align=center|13–2
|Danny Roberts
|TKO (punches)
|UFC Fight Night: Nzechukwu vs. Cuțelaba
|
|align=center|1
|align=center|3:24
|Las Vegas, Nevada, United States
|
|-
|Win
|align=center|12–2
|Ramazan Emeev
|TKO (punches)
|UFC 275
|
|align=center|1
|align=center|2:32
|Kallang, Singapore
|
|-
|Win
|align=center|11–2
|Pete Rodriguez
|TKO (punches)
|UFC 270
|
|align=center|1
|align=center|2:59
|Anaheim, California, United States
|
|-
|Win
|align=center|10–2
|Ange Loosa
|Decision (unanimous)
|Dana White's Contender Series 39
|
|align=center|3
|align=center|5:00
|Las Vegas, Nevada, United States
|
|-
|Win
|align=center|9–2
|Aldin Bates
|KO (punch)
|Eternal MMA 53
|
|align=center|1
|align=center|1:12
|Perth, Australia
|
|-
|Win
|align=center|8–2
|Glen Pettigrew
|TKO (punches)
|Eternal MMA 51
|
|align=center|2
|align=center|1:55
|Perth, Australia
|
|-
|Win
|align=center|7–2
|Kevin Jousset
|TKO (doctor stoppage)
|Eternal MMA 48
|
|align=center|2
|align=center|5:00
|Melbourne, Australia
|
|-
|Win
|align=center|6–2
|Dean Abramo
|TKO (punches)
|Eternal MMA 37
|
|align=center|1
|align=center|2:27
|Perth, Australia
|
|-
|Win
|align=center|5–2
|Luke Howard
|KO (punch)
|Eternal MMA 31
|
|align=center|2
|align=center|0:28
|Perth, Australia
|
|-
|Win
|align=center|4–2
|James Duckett
|Submission (rear-naked choke)
|Cage Warriors 88
|
|align=center|2
|align=center|3:44
|Liverpool, England
|
|-
|Win
|align=center|3–2
|Ty Duncan
|TKO (punches)
|Eternal MMA 26
|
|align=center|2
|align=center|0:19
|Southport, Australia
|
|-
|Win
|align=center|2–2
|Glen Pettigrew
|TKO (punches)
|Reign Fighting 3
|
|align=center|1
|align=center|3:26
|Mansfield, Australia
|
|-
|Win
|align=center|1–2
|Brandt Cogill
|KO (elbow)
|Eternal MMA 20
|
|align=center|1
|align=center|1:57
|Southport, Australia
|
|-
|Loss
|align=center|0–2
|Darcy Vendy
|Submission (rear-naked choke)
|Eternal MMA 17
|
|align=center|1
|align=center|4:11
|Nerang, Australia
|
|-
|Loss
|align=center|0–1
|Aldin Bates
|TKO (punches)
|Eternal MMA 15
|
|align=center|3
|align=center|2:16
|Perth, Australia
|
|-

See also
 List of current UFC fighters
 List of male mixed martial artists

References

External links
 
 

1996 births
Living people
Australian male mixed martial artists
Welterweight mixed martial artists
Mixed martial artists utilizing Brazilian jiu-jitsu
Ultimate Fighting Championship male fighters
Australian practitioners of Brazilian jiu-jitsu